Dingles Fairground Heritage Centre, formerly known as Dingles Steam Village, is a museum that features a collection of historical fairground rides, equipment, and other memorabilia. Located in Lifton, Devon, United Kingdom, the museum is operated by a charity called the Fairground Heritage Trust and first opened to the public in 2003. The rides are restored and placed into operation for guests to experience, with many dating back to the early 20th century, complete with original artwork.

History 
The Fairgrounds Heritage Trust charity was incorporated in 1986 with the goal of collecting and restoring historical funfair items, including rides, games, and artwork dating back to the 19th century. It opened the Dingles Steam Village museum at its present location in Lifton, Devon, in 2003. Following an expansion in 2006, the museum reopened in 2007 as Dingles Fairground Heritage Centre.

Rides, stall games, and artwork in the charity's collection were once featured in travelling funfairs. Rides are restored, and those that can be returned to working order are placed in operation for visitors to ride. Attractions require tokens that guests must purchase in addition to general admission. Notable rides in the vintage collection include a 1930s-era Edwards' Dodgems bumper car ride, a Joy Wheel featuring a spinning disc dating as far back as 1910, and a 1938 Shaw's Moonrocket thought to be the last of its kind in existence.

As a result of the COVID-19 pandemic, the museum closed in March 2020 and struggled financially without an income. Many items in the charity's collection were auctioned off to raise money, and through the auction they managed to raise £50,000. In November 2021, Fairground Heritage received an additional £70,000 from the government, which was part of a funding effort to aid museums and art galleries that struggled during the pandemic. The museum plans to reopen in April 2022 and will debut another expansion that was originally planned for 2021.

References 

2003 establishments in England
Amusement parks in England
Amusement parks opened in 2003
Tourist attractions in Devon